For Peace and Stability (Russian: За мир и стабильность) was a Ukrainian parliamentary faction in its national parliament Verkhovna Rada from 2 July 2014 till 27 November 2014. The group included 34 MPs.

History
For Peace and Stability was created by MPs Vitaly Grushevskii, Evgeniy Balitskii and Oleksandr Prysiazhniuk. Prysiazhniuk had just left the faction of the Communist Party of Ukraine the day before. Balitskii and Grushevskii were former MPs of Party of Regions. Balitskii and Grushevskii had left the faction of Party of regions on 3 June 2014. Almost all of the other members were also former MPs of Party of Regions and a few former MPs for the Communist Party. Lev Mirimsky of the party Union was also a member of the faction. Mirimsky is one of the five MPs from the 10 MPs elected in the Autonomous Republic of Crimea during the 2012 Ukrainian parliamentary election that became a member of the faction.

The parliamentary group was not revived after the 2014 parliamentary elections in Ukraine and thus ceased to exist at 27 November 2014, the first day of the parliament elected in 2014.

Members

Party affiliation
 Party of Regions (former members)
 Communist Party of Ukraine (former members)
 Party "Union"

Notes

References

External links
Personal website of faction member Lev Mirimsky 

Parliamentary groups in Ukraine
2014 establishments in Ukraine
Euromaidan